Pauck is a surname. Notable people with the surname include:

Heinz Pauck (1904–1986), German screenwriter
Thomas Pauck Rogne (born 1990), Norwegian professional footballer
Wilhelm Pauck (1901–1981), German-American church historian, theologian and biographer

See also 
Pauk (surname)